Tracey Bruce Eaton (born July 19, 1965) is a former American football defensive back in the National Football League. He played for the Houston Oilers, Phoenix Cardinals and Atlanta Falcons. He played college football for the Portland State Vikings.

He is also an entrepreneur and found success. Eaton and his wife, Kimberly, are invited to speak on stage across the world to millions of people each year. They have coached and mentored thousands to create financial and holistic success.

References

1965 births
Living people
American football defensive backs
Houston Oilers players
Phoenix Cardinals players
Atlanta Falcons players
Portland State Vikings football players
Sportspeople from Medford, Oregon
Players of American football from Oregon